The 1940 United States elections was held on November 5. The Democratic Party continued to dominate national politics, as it defended its Congressional majorities and retained the presidency. It was the last election prior to the attack on Pearl Harbor and America's entry into World War II.

In the presidential election, Democratic incumbent President Franklin D. Roosevelt was elected to serve an unprecedented third term, defeating Republican businessman Wendell Willkie of New York. Although Willkie fared better than the previous two Republican presidential candidates, Roosevelt crushed Willkie in the electoral college and won the popular vote by ten points. At the 1940 Democratic National Convention, Roosevelt overcame opposition from Vice President John Nance Garner and Postmaster General James Farley to win on the first ballot. Willkie won the Republican nomination on the sixth ballot, defeating Ohio Senator Robert A. Taft and Manhattan District Attorney Thomas Dewey.

The Democrats gained five seats in the House of Representatives, furthering their majority over the Republicans. The Democrats also maintained a majority in the U.S. Senate; however, they lost three seats to the Republicans in that house.

See also
 1940 United States presidential election
 1940 United States House of Representatives elections
 1940 United States Senate elections
 1940 United States gubernatorial elections

References

 
1940